Don't Cry Mommy is a 2012 South Korean crime drama film directed by Kim Yong-han. The story was about a mother's revenge against her daughter's rapists. It premiered at the 2012 Busan International Film Festival before its theatrical release.

The film was inspired by Kim Bu-Nam case. Director Kim Yong-han said he wanted to raise awareness about sex crimes by charting "the tragic course of the lives of victims and their families as vividly as possible. Sexual abuse is like devastating a human's soul."

Plot
Recently divorced, Yoo-lim (Yoo Sun) now lives with her only daughter, Eun-ah (Nam Bo-ra). Upon arriving at her new school, Eun-ah is frequently picked on, though she has feelings for classmate Jo-han (Shin Dongho). One day she is brutally raped by Jo-han and his friends who threaten to upload footage of the rape online to keep her quiet. Unable to cope with the trauma she was forced to endure, Eun-ah takes her own life. As all of the boys involved in the rape are still minors, the law is helpless to prosecute them to the fullest extent possible, and they walk away with little more than a slap on the wrist. Despite the police detective Oh's attempts to appease her, Yoo lim was still filled with frustration and anger. Hence, You-lim then sets out to make the boys' lives a living hell. She was about to kill Jo-han first but when he lied that it was his friend's plan to rape Eun-ah, she went ahead to brutally murder the two Jo-han mentioned. When Yoo-lim realised that it was Jo-han whom was behind all of this, she entered his school and attempts to kill him, but police detective Oh, investigating Eun-ah's death rushes over to stop her. When confronted, Yoo-lim, having had enough of all she had to go through, makes an attempt to deliver the fatal blow, forcing  detective Oh to shoot her with his gun, killing her .

Cast
 Yoo Sun as Yoo-lim
 Nam Bo-ra as Eun-ah, daughter of Yoo-lim
 Shin Dongho as Jo-han, schoolmate of Eun-ah
 Yu Oh-seong as police detective
 Kwon Hyun-sang as Park Joon
 Choi Dae-chul as Yoo-lim's ex-husband

Awards and nominations
2013 Baeksang Arts Awards
Nomination - Best New Actress - Nam Bo-ra

2013 Blue Dragon Film Awards
Nomination - Best New Actress - Nam Bo-ra

References

External links
  
 
 
 

2012 films
2012 crime drama films
South Korean crime drama films
Rape and revenge films
Films about bullying
Films about school violence
Films shot in Incheon
2010s Korean-language films
SBS Contents Hub films
2012 directorial debut films
2010s South Korean films